"I Don't Know Why You Don't Want Me" is a song co-written and recorded by American country music artist Rosanne Cash.  It was released in February 1985 as the first single from the album Rhythm & Romance.  The song was Cash's fourth number one on the country charts.  The single stayed at number one for a single week and spent a total of 15 weeks in the top 40.  Cash wrote the song with then-husband Rodney Crowell. In 1986, the song - which was written by Cash in response to losing a Grammy to Juice Newton in 1983 - garnered Rosanne Cash her first Grammy Award.

Charts

Weekly charts

Year-end charts

References

1985 singles
1985 songs
Rosanne Cash songs
RPM Country Tracks number-one singles of the year
Songs written by Rosanne Cash
Songs written by Rodney Crowell
Song recordings produced by David Malloy
Columbia Records singles
Song recordings produced by Rodney Crowell